Oscar David Albayalde   (born November 8, 1963) is a retired Filipino police officer who served as the Chief of the Philippine National Police from April 2018 until his optional retirement in October 2019.

Early life and education
Albayalde was born on November 8, 1963, in San Fernando, Pampanga, the son of Philippine Air Force retired master sergeant Fidel S. Albayalde and Consolacion David.

He studied at the University of the Assumption in San Fernando, Pampanga for two years, from 1980 to 1982, and then entered the Philippine Military Academy, because of the influence of his father. At the PMA, Albayalde had a Bachelor of Science degree and graduated cum laude on March 22, 1986, after constantly landing in the dean, academic and superintendent's lists. He is a member of the Philippine Military Academy Sinagtala Class of 1986 and his classmates or "mistah" includes his predecessor, former Bureau of Corrections Director and now Senator Ronald dela Rosa.

After graduating, he became a member of the elite Special Action Force.

From 1995 to 1996, Albayalde undertook further studies earning him a master's degree in Public Administration from the Manuel L. Quezon University.

Career
Before becoming the director of the NCRPO, Albayalde served as the provincial police chief of Pampanga. However, in 2014, he was dismissed from his post following a drug-related operation conducted by police in Mexico, Pampanga. The case against him was later dismissed.

As NCRPO Regional Director 
In July 2016, Albayalde was appointed as the Regional Director of the National Capital Region Police Office. He was known to be a disciplinarian in his commands during his stint, conducting surprise inspections in various police stations in Metro Manila resulting in the dismissal of cops caught sleeping and drinking while on duty. It was during his time that the entire Caloocan Police Force and its officers were dismissed following the deaths of Kian Delos Santos and Carl Angelo Arnaiz. He was also instrumental in the preparations for the 2017 ASEAN Summits and was in command of the police response during the 2017 Resorts World Manila attack.

As PNP Chief 
Following the retirement of Ronald dela Rosa, Albayalde was appointed Philippine National Police Chief by President Rodrigo Duterte in April 2018. During his stint as PNP commander, he oversaw the early security preparations for the 2019 Philippine general elections as a result of a series of high-profile killings including that of AKO Bicol party-list representative Rodel Batocabe.

He was implicated in a controversy involving the case of the 13 officers of the Pampanga police, who were branded as "ninja cops" by the media. The officers were alleged to have profited from methamphetamine seized from an operation in 2013 against a suspected Chinese drug lord and Albayalde who was the chief of the Pampanga police at the time was accused of intervening of the case by seeking the dismissal order against his former subordinates. Albayalde was also alleged to have benefited from the selling of the seized contraband. Albayalde has denied the accusations.

He resigned from his position as police chief and went on non-duty status on October 14, 2019, which meant he remained a member of the police. He was set to officially retire from the police force on November 8, 2019, upon reaching the mandatory retirement age of 56 and to handover his position as chief on October 29, 2019, had he not resigned. According to the government, Albayalde stepped down in a bid to spare the Philippine National Police from the controversy and denied pressuring Albayalde to do so. He became the first PNP chief to go into non-duty status.

Personal life
He is called "Odie" or "Oca" by his peers. Albayalde is married to Cherrylyn Albayalde, and they have four children. His hobbies include skydiving, scuba diving and motorcycle riding.

Awards
  Philippine Republic Presidential Unit Citation
  Gawad Mabini
  Philippine Legion of Honor - Degree of Officer
  People Power II Unit Citation
  Medalya ng Katangitanging Gawa (PNP Outstanding Achievement Medal)
  Medalya ng Katapatan sa Paglilingkod (PNP Distinguished Service Medal) 
  Special Action Force Badge
  PNP Parachutist Badge

References

Living people
Kapampangan people
1963 births
Filipino police chiefs
Philippine Military Academy alumni
People from San Fernando, Pampanga
Duterte administration personnel
People of the Philippine Drug War
Philippine Military Academy Class of 1986